Cnemaspis nigridia, also known as the Borneo black gecko or black-spotted rock gecko,  is a species of gecko found in Malaysia and Indonesia.

References

nigridia
Reptiles described in 1925
Taxa named by Malcolm Arthur Smith